Michael Golden (born 1942) was a justice of the Wyoming Supreme Court.

Biography
Michael Golden was born in 1942. In high school, he played baseball with Dick Cheney in Casper, Wyoming. He received a B.A. in 1964 and a J.D. in 1967, both from the University of Wyoming. In 1992, he received an LLM from the University of Virginia Law School.

He served in the Judge Advocate General's Corps for four years. In 1988, he was appointed as a Justice in the Wyoming Supreme Court. From 1994 to 1996, he served as its chief justice. In June 2011, he authored a decision to grant divorces to same-sex married couples, despite the illegality of same-sex marriage in Wyoming at the time. Golden retired from the Wyoming Supreme Court in August 2012.

References

Living people
1942 births
Politicians from Casper, Wyoming
Wyoming lawyers
Justices of the Wyoming Supreme Court
Chief Justices of the Wyoming Supreme Court